Makenna Cowgill (born September 11, 1998) is an American actress. She has provided voices for many animated and non-animated movies.

Filmography 
 Bambi II (2006)
 Meet the Robinsons (2007)
 The Time Traveler's Wife (2009)
 Diary of a Wimpy Kid (2010)
 Diary of a Wimpy Kid: Rodrick Rules
 "Kung Fu Panda 2"
 "Astro Boy"
 "Madagascar: Escape 2 Africa"
 "Madagascar 3: Europe's Most Wanted"
 "Monster House"
 "Megamind"
 Monsters University
 "Kung Fu Panda Holiday"
 "Monsters vs. Aliens: Mutant Pumpkins from Outer Space"
 "NCIS"
 "CSI"
 "Modern Family"
 "Sordid Lives"

References

External links 
 

American television actresses
American film actresses
Living people
1998 births
21st-century American women